Pierre-Louis Gabriel Falaize (18 August 1905 – 31 August 1974) was a French Ambassador.

Career
From 1932 to 1939 he was Political commentator at L'Aube (newspaper).
From 1937 to 1939 he was Political commentator at Paris-Soir.
From 1944 to 1948 he was Director of the Cabinet of Georges Bidault (Minister of Foreign Affairs then President of the Provisional Government of the French Republic)
From 1949 to 1950 he was Director of the Cabinet of Georges Bidault, the President of the council.
From 1951 to 1952 he was Director of the Office of Georges Bidault, the Minister of National Defense.
In 1953 he was director of the United Nations Center. In the Middle East, Minister Plenipotentiary, director of the Cabinet of Georges Bidault, the Minister of Foreign Affairs.
From 1954 to 1957 he was ambassador in Amman.
In 1958 he was ambassador in Tripoli (Libya).
From December 1959-February 1964 he was ambassador in Vientiane (Laos).
From March 1964 to 1967 he was ambassador in Beirut (Lebanon), on 18 May 1964 he was concurrent accredited in Kuwait City (Kuwait).

References

1905 births
1974 deaths
Ambassadors of France to Jordan
Ambassadors of France to Libya
Ambassadors of France to Lebanon